Garrha oncospila is a moth in the family Oecophoridae. It was described by Turner in 1946. It is found in Australia, where it has been recorded from Western Australia.

References

Moths described in 1946
Garrha